A  is a ritual brass, copper, or bronze mirror used in shamanism in some parts of Mongolia and in the Republic of Buryatia. The mirror is typically round and ornamented on one side but polished on the other, although this may vary between regions and ethnic groups (see below).

Description 

Function 

 help ward off harmful or attacking spirits in their own right, and also can be thought of as an object which signifies the shaman's authority or role. Among the Daur, the number of  collected by a Daur shaman was an indicator of their level of power.

s have additional purposes as well, for example, among the Daur people and all the other shamanistic groups who use them, they are used for a variety of practices, including to purifying and empowering water or vodka, collecting and trapping hostile spirits, and providing a home for helper spirits. They also act as vessels for the shaman's spiritual power, called the 'wind horse' in Mongolia. They can also collect and store the power of blessings, or power given from the sun, moon, stars or other parts of the world, all of which can be given to a sick person, or which can be added to the shaman's own power. 

Walther Heissig, describing shamans and their incantations in Hure Banner in the 1940s, remarks that a woman shaman indicated that the  contained "the white horses of the shamans"; the mirror itself was seen as a vehicle for the shamans.

See also 
 Melong
 Mirror armour
 Shinju-kyo
 TLV mirror

References

Bibliography 

 
 
 
 
 

Mongolian shamanism
Religion in Mongolia
Mirrors
Mongol mythology